Johannes Otieno Angela was the inaugural Anglican Bishop of Bondo, serving from 2000 to 2017.

References

21st-century Anglican bishops of the Anglican Church of Kenya
Anglican bishops of Bondo
Living people
Year of birth missing (living people)
Place of birth missing (living people)